This article lists the squads for the 2017 Tournament of Nations, the inaugural edition of the Tournament of Nations. The cup consisted of a series of friendly games, and was held in the United States from 27 July to 3 August 2017. The four national teams involved in the tournament registered a squad of 23 players.

The age listed for each player is on 27 July 2017, the first day of the tournament. The club listed is the club for which the player last played a competitive match prior to the tournament. The nationality for each club reflects the national association (not the league) to which the club is affiliated. A flag is included for coaches that are of a different nationality than their own national team.

Squads

Australia
Coach: Alen Stajcic

The final squad was announced on 17 July 2017. Following the second match of the tournament, Lydia Williams suffered an injury and was replaced by Teagan Micah.

Brazil
Coach:  Emily Lima

The final squad was announced on 10 July 2017.

Japan
Coach: Asako Takakura

The final squad was announced on 14 July 2017. On 21 July 2017, Kaede Nakamura withdrew due to injury and was replaced with Miho Manya.

United States
Coach: Jill Ellis

The final squad was announced on 20 July 2017.

Player representation

By club
Clubs with 3 or more players represented are listed.

By club nationality

By club federation

By representatives of domestic league

References

2017
2017 in American women's soccer
2017 in women's association football
July 2017 sports events in the United States